Itapemirim may refer to the following:

 Itapemirim River, a river in the state of Espírito Santo, Brazil
 Itapemirim, Espírito Santo, a municipality in the same state
 Itapemirim (bus company), a bus company from that city
 ITA Transportes Aéreos, a Brazilian airline relaunched in 2021